Benedikte is a first name. It can refer to:
 Benedikte Naubert (1756–1819), German writer
 Princess Benedikte of Denmark (born 1944), a member of the Danish royal family
 Benedikte Hansen (born 1958), Danish actress
 Benedikte Kiær (born 1969), Danish politician

See also
 Benedict (disambiguation)